Roberto Silva Nazzari (born 1938) is a Uruguayan chess player, Uruguayan Chess Championship winner (1971).

Biography
In the 1960s and 1970s Roberto Silva Nazzari was one of Uruguayan leading chess players. In 1971 he won Uruguayan Chess Championship. Roberto Silva Nazzari was participant of a number of international tournaments in South America. In 1972, in São Paulo he participated in World Chess Championship South American Zonal tournament and ranked in 18th place.

Roberto Silva Nazzari played for Uruguay in the Chess Olympiads:
 In 1962, at first reserve board in the 15th Chess Olympiad in Varna (+4, =4, -5),
 In 1976, at fourth board in the 22nd Chess Olympiad in Haifa (+1, =4, -2),
 In 1978, at third board in the 23rd Chess Olympiad in Buenos Aires (+2, =5, -3).

Roberto Silva Nazzari played for Uruguay in the Pan American Team Chess Championship:
 In 1991, at fourth board in the 4th Panamerican Team Chess Championship in Guarapuava (+0, =3, -2).

References

External links

Roberto Silva Nazzari chess games at 365chess.com
Roberto Silva Nazzari chess games at 365chess.com (another link with 1976 chess olympiad games)

1938 births
Living people
Uruguayan chess players
Chess Olympiad competitors
20th-century chess players